Crown Alexandra Football Club was a football club located in Dartford, in Kent, England

History
Crown Alexandra was formed by Michael Day in July 2007. The club started out in the Kent Suburban Sunday League in Division Four and rose through the leagues via four promotions to the Premier Division. They won the League in 2008–09. In July 2012, Crown were elected to the Kent Invicta Football League, despite finishing eighth in the South London Alliance Division Three. They resigned from the Kent Invicta Football League in December 2012. In July 2013, the club's committee decided to move the club back to one Sunday team playing in the Woolwich and Eltham Sunday Football Alliance.

Colours
The home kit was blue shirts with a white central stripe, blue shorts and blue socks. The away kit was orange shirts with a black central stripe, black shorts and orange socks.

Ground
The club played its home matches at the Leigh Technology Academy, Green Street Green Road, Dartford, Kent, DA1 1QE

Honours
Kent Suburban League
Division Four champions 2008–09

References

External links

Defunct football clubs in England
Kent Invicta Football League
Association football clubs established in 2007
Defunct football clubs in Kent
2007 establishments in England
South London Football Alliance
Association football clubs disestablished in 2013